Hounslow Council in London, England is elected every four years. 60 councillors are elected from 20 wards, with by-elections held to fill any vacancies between elections.

Political control
Since 1964 political control of the council has been held by the following parties:

Leadership
The leaders of the council since 1965 have been:

Council elections
 1964 Hounslow London Borough Council election
 1968 Hounslow London Borough Council election
 1971 Hounslow London Borough Council election (boundary changes took place but the number of seats remained the same)
 1974 Hounslow London Borough Council election
 1978 Hounslow London Borough Council election (boundary changes took place but the number of seats remained the same)
 1982 Hounslow London Borough Council election
 1986 Hounslow London Borough Council election
 1990 Hounslow London Borough Council election
 1994 Hounslow London Borough Council election (boundary changes took place but the number of seats remained the same)
 1998 Hounslow London Borough Council election 
 2002 Hounslow London Borough Council election (boundary changes took place but the number of seats remained the same) 
 2006 Hounslow London Borough Council election
 2010 Hounslow London Borough Council election
 2014 Hounslow London Borough Council election
 2018 Hounslow London Borough Council election
 2022 Hounslow London Borough Council election

Borough result maps

By-election results

1964-1968
There were several by-elections in 1964 arising from elected Councillors being appointed as Aldermen.
Details required

1968-1971

1971-1974

1974-1978

1978-1982

1982-1986

1986-1990

1990-1994

The by-election was called following the death of Cllr. Henry A. North.

The by-election was called following the resignations of Cllrs. Valerie D. Marks and William H. Martin.

The by-election was called following the resignation of Cllr. Peter E. Leggett.

The by-election was called following the death of Cllr. Peter Caldwell.

The by-election was called following the death of Cllr. Edward J. Pauling.

1994-1998

The by-election was called following the resignation of Cllr. Michael F. Hoban. 

The by-election was called following the resignation of Cllr. Antony Louki.

1998-2002

The by-election was called following the resignation of Cllr. Peter D. Nathan.

The by-election was called following the resignation of Cllr. Brian W. Price.

The by-election was called following the resignation of Cllr. Pamela Wharfe.

The by-election was called following the death of Cllr. Josephine C. F. Langton.

2002-2006

The by-election was called following the death of Cllr. Walter J. Hill.

The by-election was called following the death of Cllr. John S. Gray.

The by-election was called following the death of Cllr. Roger M. Clarke.

The by-election was called following the resignation of Cllr. Sally L. Gilson.

The by-election was called following the death of Cllr. Premila Bhanderi.

2006-2010

The by-election was called following the resignation of Cllr. Harley F. W. Buckner.

The by-election was called following the death of Cllr. Robert R. F. Kinghorn.

2010-2014
There were no by-elections.

2014-2018
There were two by-elections in this period.

2018-2022
There have been no by-elections in this period.

References

By-election results

External links
Hounslow Council